Jolly Katongole (15 December 1985 – 14 May 2015) was a boxer from Uganda, who participated in the 2004 Summer Olympics for his native African country. 

Katongole debuted with the national team at the age of 16. He won the bronze medal at the 2003 All-Africa Games in Abuja, Nigeria. Katongole qualified for the Athens Olympics by winning the gold medal at the 1st AIBA African 2004 Olympic Qualifying Tournament in Casablanca, Morocco. In the final of the event he defeated Morocco's Redouane Bouchtouk. At the Olympics, he was stopped in the first round of the light flyweight (– 48 kg) division by Turkey's eventual runner-up Atagün Yalçınkaya. Following his defeat, Katongole deserted the Ugandan delegation and remained illegally in Greece until he was deported. He struggled with substance abuse issues until his death in 2015, reportedly of tetanus.

References

1985 births
2015 deaths
Light-flyweight boxers
Olympic boxers of Uganda
Boxers at the 2004 Summer Olympics
Ugandan male boxers
African Games bronze medalists for Uganda
African Games medalists in boxing
Competitors at the 2003 All-Africa Games
Sportspeople from Kampala